The Saptakoteshwar temple at Narve in Goa, India, is considered to be one of the six great sites of temples of Shiva in the Konkan area.

History
Saptakoteshwar, a form of Shiva, was one of the chief deities of the Kings of the Kadamba dynasty around the twelfth century. The temple was built by the King for his wife Kamaldevi who was a staunch devotee of this god.  The Kadamba kings proudly used the title (Birudu) Shree Saptakotisha Ladbha Varaveera.

The gold coins discovered at Chandor, Goa (old name: Chandraura, Chandrapura), Gopikapatna and other places of the kings Jayakeshi I, Jayakeshi II, Jayakeshi III, Shivachitta Paramadideva, Soideva, etc., have inscriptions reading:

which means "with the grace of Lord Saptakotishwara", the family deity of Kadambas.
These coins were often referred to as Saptakotisha-Gadyanakas.

In 1352, when the Kadamba kingdom was conquered by the Bahmani Sultan Allauddin Hasan Gangu, Goa came under the rule of the Sultan for about 14 years. A number of temples were destroyed during this period and the linga (symbol of Lord Shiva) at the Saptakoteshwar temple was dug up by the troops.

In 1367, the army of Vijayanagar King Harihararaya defeated the Bahmani Sultan's troops in Goa and managed to restore most of the temples to their former glory including that of Saptakoteshwar. According to the records, the temple was reconstructed by Madhava Mantri by the end of the 14th century.

When the temple was demolished in 1560 by the Portuguese (and a chapel dedicated to Nossa Senhora De Candelaria was erected in its place), the linga was used as a well shaft until some Hindus managed to rescue it. The idol was then smuggled across the river to Bicholim where it was installed in a brand new temple and revamped in 1668 by the Maratha Chatrapati Shivaji Maharaj. The construction of the new site was carried out by Shri Shivaram Desai (president of the sansthan) on Chatrapati Shivaji Maharaj's blessings and guidance.

Architecture
With its shallow Hindu kalash dome mounted on an octagonal drum sloping tiled roofs, European style Mandapa, or assembly hall and tall lamp tower or Deepastamba, the temple is situated in an archaeologically important area. The surroundings of the temple are tinged with several Brahminical laterite and stone caves. In the vicinity of it existed a Jain Math, the ruins of which are still visible.

Deities
In front of the temple towards the right side of the Deepastamba is a shrine of Kalbhairav and outside it are seen the padukas of Dattatraya carved on the stone. A little ahead of the Deepastamba are seen two huge laterite pillar-like structures buried deep. They may be stone henges. Behind the temple are carved stone walls with niches. It may have been an ancient Agrashala. Similarly, close to the temple there is a man-made tunnel-like structure which is presently silted. Near the temple site there is a sacred tank known as Panchaganga Tirtha which is used for ablutions by devotees on the birthday of Lord Shiva.

Location

Footnotes

References
Goa: Hindu temples and deities by Rui Gomes Pereira, Antonio Victor Couto, v. 1, 1978.

Shiva temples in Goa
Hindu temples in North Goa district